Yefremov (fem. Yefremova) is a Russian surname.

Yefremov (masculine) or Yefremova (feminine) may also refer to:
Yefremov Urban Okrug, a municipal formation which Yefremovsky District in Tula Oblast, Russia is incorporated as
Yefremov (town), a town in Tula Oblast, Russia
Yefremov (air base), a military airfield near Yefremov, Russia
12975 Efremov, a main-belt asteroid

See also
Yefremovsky (disambiguation)